Debra Mooney (born August 28, 1947) is an American character actress, best known for her role as Edna Harper on The WB drama series Everwood (2002–06). Mooney is also known for her recurring roles in Scandal, Grey's Anatomy and The Originals.

Life and career
Mooney was born Debra Vick in Aberdeen, South Dakota, and grew up in Ellendale, North Dakota, the daughter of Isabel (née Smith) and Henry M. Vick. She was married to stage manager, producer, and director Porter Van Zandt until his death in 2012.

Mooney is best known for her role as Edna Harper on The WB drama series Everwood. The series aired from 2002 to 2006. She has appeared in many stage productions and played roles of over 80 films and TV shows. Her notable film credits include Chapter Two opposite Marsha Mason, and Tootsie, Dead Poets Society and Domestic Disturbance.

On television she also starred of short-lived series Dream Street, Davis Rules and Kirk. Mooney guest-starred as the oblivious plutocrat Meg Wellman on Roseanne. She also appeared in Seinfeld, ER, Everybody Loves Raymond, Grey's Anatomy, Bones and Weeds. From 2012 to 2013, she played the role of Supreme Court Justice Verna Thornton in the second season of ABC drama series Scandal created by Shonda Rhimes.

In 2014, she had a recurring role in the Netflix comedy series, Arrested Development. That same year, she joined the cast of The CW series, The Originals in a recurring role as Werewolf Matriarch. In 2016, she starred in the ABC drama pilot The Death of Eva Sofia Valdez, starring Gina Torres in a title role, with Eric Close, Melora Hardin, and Christina Pickles.

Filmography

Film

Television

Theater

References

External links
 
 

1947 births
Actresses from South Dakota
American film actresses
American stage actresses
American television actresses
American voice actresses
Living people
People from Aberdeen, South Dakota
People from Ellendale, North Dakota
20th-century American actresses
21st-century American actresses